Omm ol Ghezlan or Omm ol Ghazlan may refer to:
 Omm ol Ghezlan, Ramshir
 Omm ol Ghezlan, Shadegan